Mamdooh Al-Doseri (born 4 August 1971) is a Bahraini former cyclist. He competed in the team time trial at the 1992 Summer Olympics.

References

1971 births
Living people
Bahraini male cyclists
Olympic cyclists of Bahrain
Cyclists at the 1992 Summer Olympics
Place of birth missing (living people)